Al Posto Del Fuoco is the fourth album of the Italian alternative rock band Meganoidi.

Track listing
 Altrove - 3:01
 Aneta - 3:09
 Dighe - 3:28
 Dune - 4:49
 Scusami Las Vegas - 3:32
 Ima-Go-Go - 3:13
 Mia - 2:57
 Solo Alla Fine - 3:14
 Your Desire - 3:15
Stormo - 4:34
 Al Posto Del Fuoco - 3:01

References

2009 albums
Meganoidi albums